Ricardo Arap Bethke Galdames (born 12 March 1980) is a Mexican actor.

Early life
Bethke was born on 12 March 1980 in Nairobi, Kenya, as Ricardo Arap Bethke Galdames. In the African language "Arap Bethke" means "Bethke's son." His father, Claus Bethke is German and his mother, Patricia Galdames is Chilean. He lived in Nairobi until he was 5 years old. His father worked at the United Nations, so this caused them to move from one country to another. At a very young age, he arrived in Mexico where he lived all his childhood and adolescence. He attended high school at Peterson College. and later studied at the Universidad Iberoamericana, where he graduated with a degree in communication. He has two brothers and a sister, who was born in Washington, United States, and a brother who was born in Ecuador named Beto Bethke. Bethke speaks four languages: Spanish, English, Italian and French. Due to his upbringing, Bethke has called himself a "Mexikenian", due to his Kenyan birth and Mexican nationality.

Career
Bethke played the role of "Chacho" in the telenovela Clase 406. In 2007 he appeared in the Ugly Betty episode "A Tree Grows in Guadalajara as Antonio Barreiro, a cafe waiter.

Bethke also starred in "Tierra de pasiones", and in Madre Luna as Demetrio Aguirre. He is also one of the main characters in Doña Bárbara (Telemundo series), playing the role of "Antonio Sandoval"."

Bethke has also guest-starred on the 1st season of RBD: La Familia as "Alvaro"; Dulce Maria's new hot conquest, on episode 3 "El Que Quiera Azul Celeste... Que Se Acueste!". His cast members were Alfonso Herrera, Anahí, Dulce Maria, Christopher Uckermann, Maite Perroni, & Christian Chávez, the stars of the show and the members of the Latin pop band RBD from Mexico city.

Arap currently lives in Los Angeles, California. and is engaged to actress Ivana De Maria, with whom he has been dating since 2017.

Filmography

Film roles

Television roles

Awards and nominations

References

External links
 

1980 births
Living people
Naturalized citizens of Mexico
Mexican male film actors
Mexican male telenovela actors
Mexican people of Chilean descent
Mexican people of German descent